Maplewood is an inner-ring suburb of St. Louis, located in St. Louis County, Missouri, United States.

History
Maplewood was established around the turn of the 20th century. Maplewood was one of the early suburbs of St. Louis. Located just outside the city limits, Maplewood was located at the end of one of St. Louis's streetcar lines and was also located near major railroads.

It was built as a bedroom community. Advertising suggested that people should get away from the city (in an era of common and sooty commercial, industrial, and domestic coal burning) and enjoy the fresh air of less densely populated areas like Maplewood. Maplewood's historic residential areas were mostly built from 1900 to 1910 and a number of well-preserved homes remain. Several of these homes have remained in the same family for generations.

Maplewood is currently being revitalized by an influx of restaurants, businesses, and shops around Manchester Ave., Sutton Ave., and the Greenwood Historic District.

Under a local nuisance ordinance, a person who calls the police for domestic violence more than twice in 180 days can face eviction. In 2012, a woman was evicted from her home after she had called the police four times to request protection from physical assaults by her ex-boyfriend. She became homeless in the process. In 2017, the ACLU filed a lawsuit on behalf of the victim, claiming that the Maplewood nuisance ordinance violates the First Amendment right to petition the government for assistance, as well as the rights to travel, equal protection and due process. In 2018, the ordinance was revised to eliminate language that allowed officials to fine or evict people who were victims of crime. In 2021, residents of the city elected Nikylan Knapper as the city's first black mayor.

Geography
Maplewood is located at  (38.612535, -90.321339).

Demographics

2020 census
As of 2020, there were 8,269 people living in the city.

2010 census
At the 2010 census there were 8,046 people, 4,269 households, and 1,769 families living in the city. The racial makeup of the city was 74.1% White, 17.2% African American, 0.2% Native American, 3.5% Asian, 0.1% Pacific Islander, 1.3% from other races, and 3.5% from two or more races. Hispanic or Latino of any race were 2.22%.

Of the 4,269 households 18.6% had children under the age of 18 living with them, 25.3% were married couples living together, 12.2% had a female householder with no husband present, and 58.6% were non-families. 48.6% of households were one person and 6.5% were one person aged 65 or older. The average household size was 1.88 and the average family size was 2.78.

The age distribution was 19.1% under the age of 20, 9.1% from 20 to 24, 37.0% from 25 to 44, 26.9% from 45 to 64, and 7.9% 65 or older. The median age was 34.7 years. The city was 50.2% male and 49.8% female.

2000 census
At the 2000 census there were 9,228 people, 4,815 households, and 2,041 families living in the city. The racial makeup of the city was 76.16% White, 15.93% African American, 0.33% Native American, 4.23% Asian, 0.07% Pacific Islander, 0.72% from other races, and 2.58% from two or more races. Hispanic or Latino of any race were 2.22%.

Of the 4,815 households 19.1% had children under the age of 18 living with them, 27.1% were married couples living together, 81.6% had a female householder with no husband present, and 5.6% were non-families. 4.5% of households were one person and 7.5% were one person aged 65 or older. The average household size was 1.92 and the average family size was 2.83.

The age distribution was 18.3% under the age of 18, 13.0% from 18 to 24, 39.0% from 25 to 44, 20.6% from 45 to 64, and 9.1% 65 or older. The median age was 34 years. For every 100 females, there were 99.6 males. For every 100 females age 18 and over, there were 98.7 males.

In 2000 The median household income was $29,151, and the median family income  was $44,178. Males had a median income of $30,279 versus $24,025 for females. The per capita income for the city was $19,087. About 10.6% of families and 14.1% of the population were below the poverty line, including 17.5% of those under age 18 and 9.1% of those age 65 or over.

Government
Since 1978, Maplewood has utilized a charter form of government with a mayor-council-manager government structure. The mayor of Maplewood is elected at-large by the community and serves as the head of government. As of April 2021, the current mayor is Nikylan Knapper.

Transportation

Public transportation 

Maplewood is served by the Blue Line of the St. Louis region's MetroLink light rail system. The city has two stations, Maplewood-Manchester and Sunnen. Metro Transit also operates the Maplewood Transit Center located on Manchester Road. It connects the Maplewood-Manchester light rail station with MetroBus routes and paratransit services.

Major roads and highways 
Major arterial routes in Maplewood include Big Bend Boulevard, Hanley Road, and Manchester Road. Hanley Road turns into Laclede Station Road just before entering Shrewsbury to the south while Interstate 44 passes Maplewood just south of the city limits near Deer Creek.

Schools
Public education in Maplewood is administered by the Maplewood-Richmond Heights School District, which operates Maplewood Richmond Heights High School.

Maplewood has a lending library, the Maplewood Public Library.

Notable people
Mark Christman, baseball player
Ray Kennedy, jazz pianist
Pee Wee Russell, jazz musician, was born in Maplewood
Paul Christman, Pro football
Tershawn Wharton, Defensive Tackle for the Kansas City Chiefs

See also
 1939 St. Louis smog, an example of what levels pollution could rise to in nearby St. Louis
 Schlafly Bottleworks, Maplewood branch of the Saint Louis Brewery and a restaurant

References

External links

City of Maplewood official website
Maplewood Chamber of Commerce

Cities in St. Louis County, Missouri
Cities in Missouri